This is a list of rivers in the Dominican Republic, arranged in clockwise order around the island starting in the northwest corner, with respective tributaries indented under each larger stream's name.

Dajabón River (Massacre River)
Yaque del Norte River
Mao River
Yuna River
Camú River
Guamira River
 Maimón River
Yuma River
Chavón River
Soco River
Iguamo River (Higuamo River)
Ozama River
Isabela River
Yabacao River
Haina River
Rivière Soliette
Ocoa River
Nizao River
Yaque del Sur River
Limón River
San Juan River
Rivière Soliette
Pedernales River
Artibonite River
Macasía River
Libón River
Bao river

References
 The Columbia Gazetteer of North America. 2093
, GEOnet Names Server
CIA map

External links 
 
 Instituto Nacional de Recursos Hidráulicos (INDRHI). Site of the Institute of water resources of the Dominican Republic.

Dominican Republic
Rivers of the Dominican Republic
Dominican Republic